Jonathan Paredes may refer to:

 Jonathan Paredes (cyclist) (born 1989), Colombian cyclist
 Jonathan Paredes (diver) (born 1989), Mexican diver